Shane Rangi (born 3 February 1969) is a New Zealand actor from Ngati Porou.

Rangi has played many characters in The Chronicles of Narnia film series. In The Lion, The Witch and the Wardrobe he played General Otmin, general of the White Witch's army, and the centaur that blows a horn as the Pevensie children enter Aslan's camp. In Prince Caspian, he played the werewolf, Asterius the Minotaur, the Wild Bear and the Physical Aslan. In the movie Voyager of the Dawn Treader he plays Tavros the Minotaur.

In the final film of the Lord of the Rings trilogy, he plays a Mumak Mahud, a Haradrim leader who is seen riding an oliphaunt against the Rohirrim during the Battle of the Pelennor Fields.

Shane also appears in the miniseries Spartacus: Gods of the Arena as Dagan – a gladiatorial Syrian recruit.

Filmography

Film

Television

Stunts

External links

1969 births
Living people
New Zealand male film actors